Charles Frederick "Fred" Van Buren (20 June 1936 – 11 September 2006) was an Australian politician.

He was born in Kollupitiya in Ceylon, where he was educated. His father, Charles Frederick Guy Van Buren, was a Dutch Burgher, while his mother, Blossom Isabella Enright, was of Eurasian descent. He worked as a printer, and after moving to Australia was an organiser with the Labor Party's Victorian branch from 1974 to 1985. In 1985 he was elected to the Victorian Legislative Council for Eumemmerring, serving until he was defeated in 1992. Van Buren died in 2006.

References

1936 births
2006 deaths
Members of the Victorian Legislative Council
Members of the Victorian Legislative Council for Eumemmerring Province
Australian Labor Party members of the Parliament of Victoria
Australian people of Dutch descent
Australian politicians of Asian descent
Sri Lankan emigrants to Australia
20th-century Australian politicians